István Varga (born 1 January 1963) was a Hungarian professional footballer who played as a midfielder. He was a member of the Hungarian national football team.

Career 
He started playing football for KSI in 1975. From 1977 he played for MTK Budapest FC, where he made his debut in the top flight in 1982. He was a member of the 1986-87 championship-winning team. In 1988 he moved to Budapest Honvéd FC, where he won the championship and the Hungarian Cup with the team. He then moved to Belgium, where he played for K.S.V. Waregem.

National team 
Between 1987 and 1990 he played eight times for the national team.

Honours 

 Nemzeti Bajnokság I (NB I)
 Champion: 1986-87, 1988-89

 Magyar Kupa (MNK)
 Winner: 1989

References 

1963 births
Living people
Hungary international footballers
Footballers from Budapest
Association football midfielders
Budapest Honvéd FC players
Nemzeti Bajnokság I players
Hungarian footballers
Hungarian expatriate footballers
Expatriate footballers in Belgium
Expatriate footballers in Switzerland
Hungarian expatriate sportspeople in Belgium
Hungarian expatriate sportspeople in Switzerland
MTK Budapest FC players
K.S.V. Waregem players
Csepel SC footballers
SR Delémont players
Volán FC players